Mario Mutis (born 1947) is the bass player in the Chilean progressive rock-folk band Los Jaivas.

References 

1947 births
Living people
Chilean guitarists
20th-century Chilean male singers
Chilean singer-songwriters
People from Viña del Mar
Male bass guitarists
Musicians from Viña del Mar
20th-century Chilean male artists